Ionikos Nea Filadelfeia (also Ionikos Nea Philadelphia) is a sport club that is based in Nea Filadelfeia, an Athenian suburb. The full name of club is A.S. Ionikos Nea Filadelfeia (Greek: Α. Σ. Ιωνικός Νέας Φιλαδέλφειας). It was founded in 1930. The club has teams in many sports. The more successful teams are the handball and basketball teams. The colours of Ionikos are blue and white.

Basketball team

Ionikos N.F. played in the Greek Basket League from 2001 to 2005. In 2004, Ionikos moved to Amaliada, Greece and was named Iionikos N.F. Amaliada, but the team returned to Nea Filadelfeia at the end of the season. In the 2003–04 season, Ionikos played in the EuroCup, and in the 2004–05 season, Ionikos played in the EuroChallenge. Today, the team competes in the Greek B League.

Notable players

Handball team
The handball department of Ionikos is the most successful team of the club. Ionikos has got fifteen domestic titles (ten championships and five cups). In season 2010-11 Ionikos relegated in A2 Category. In recent season (2014–15), it finished in 1st place in A2 Ethniki and promoted to A1. However, it was withdrawn from the championship due to financial problems and was replaced by Archelaos Katerinis.

Titles
10 Greek Men's Championships: 1980, 1981, 1982, 1983, 1984, 1985, 1987, 1992, 1993, 1999.
5 Greek Men's Cups: 1986, 1987, 1988, 1989, 1993.
1 Greek Men's Super Cup: 1999

Recent seasons

Volleyball team
The volleyball department had also donated successes, mainly the women’s team. The women’s team has conquered two Greek championships. During last season (2012–13) the team played in A2 category, in 2nd group.

The men’s team of Ionikos plays in A2 Ethniki in 2nd group. It has played 22 times in A1 Ethniki. The better period of team was the decade of seventies when Ionikos took the three place of championship twice.

Titles
2 Greek women's championships: 1989, 1994.

References

Multi-sport clubs in Athens